The Rural Bank Building was a landmark bank and commercial building on a block bounded by Martin Place, Elizabeth Street, and Phillip Street in the central business district of Sydney. Completed in 1936 and designed in the Inter-war Art Deco style by the bank's chief architect, Frank William Turner, the building served as the Rural Bank's main headquarters until 1982. Despite its distinctive design receiving recognition for its heritage value as "one of the finest art deco buildings in Australia", including from the Australian Institute of Architects and through a listing on the Federal Register of the National Estate, the Rural Bank Building was controversially demolished in 1983 and replaced by the postmodern State Bank Centre development by Peddle Thorp & Walker, prompting greater community efforts to protect the heritage of Sydney.

Design and construction
The development of a headquarters building for the newly created (since 1 July 1933) Rural Bank of New South Wales in Martin Place was connected to the development of Martin Place itself. With the City of Sydney's extension of Martin Place to Macquarie Street due to be completed on 8 April 1936, a series of development sites along each side of the new thoroughfare had been put up for sale.

The Rural Bank's Chief Architect, Frank William Turner, was commissioned to design the new building, with excavation of the site and foundation works commencing on 20 August 1934 by A. Bradshaw Ltd. Turner's design for a restrained Art Deco style tower with a height of 150 feet to meet the height limit for the City of Sydney set under the Height of Buildings Act, 1912. The two foundation stones on either side of the Martin Place entrance were laid in an official ceremony on 19 December 1935 by the Premier of New South Wales, Bertram Stevens, and the bank president, Clarence McKerihan. The building was officially completed on 15 December 1936.

On its completion, the architectural journal Decoration and Glass, noted: 

In November 1938, two mural paintings depicting the wool and wheat industries by Norman Carter were installed in the banking chamber.

Sub-contractors and suppliers
The building was noted for having a high proportion of Australian materials used during construction, with less than 1% of materials being imported.

Timber panelling: Beale & Co. (Boardroom, commissioners), Standardised Veneer and Panel Co.
Marble and Terrazzo: Melocco Brothers.
Terrazzo window sills: Terrazzo & Co.
Electrical installation and fire alarm system: F. T. S. O'Donnell Griffen & Co. Ltd.
Strong rooms, safes and lift doors, etc.: Chubbs (Aust.) Co. Ltd.
Tiles: Australian Tesselated Tile Company.
Air conditioning, kitchen equipment, fire doors, exhaust ducts, etc.: Malley's Ltd.
Hot water and heating systems: J. Sainsbury & Co.
Filing cabinets and fireproof doors: Wormald Bros.
Smith's electric clocks and light fittings: Lawrence & Hanson.
Metal basement ceilings, Bronze Spandrels, Glazed Screen to 2nd Floor: Wunderlich Ltd..
Timber veneer doors: Frederick Rose.
Marble in vestibule walls: Gamble & Dreelin.
Glazing: J. C. Goodwin.
Steel windows and balustrading: Sydney Ore Steel Co. Ltd.
Fibrous plaster ceilings: G. R. Lumb & Sons.
Lifts and cars: Waygood Otis.
Cistern valves: John Danks & Son.
Sanitary fittings: R. Fowler Ltd. (Fowler Ware) for Tylor's Ltd.
Sanitary ware: Smith & Keelar.
Lower exterior granite fascia: Loveridge and Hudson.
Upper exterior composite fascia: Composite Stones Ltd.
Hardware: Leonard Smythe.
Water strainers: J. Wildridge & Sinclair.
Wood-core fire-proof doors: Austral Roller Shutters.

Demolition
On 9 June 1981, to mark the reconstitution of the bank as the State Bank of New South Wales from 1982, the bank's management sought to replace the existing building with a new structure for $28.5 million. The building would be replaced by a post-modern style office tower to house both the State Bank and TAA, to a design by Peddle Thorp and Walker. This sparked significant opposition from community groups, including the Royal Australian Institute of Architects and the National Trust of Australia, who initiated a public campaign to retain the Art Deco bank building. In April 1981, the Heritage Council of NSW had recommended that the Rural Bank receive state heritage protection, but controversially rescinded its decision at its August 1981 meeting following representations from the State Bank's architects. On 25 March 1982, a public protest was held on Martin Place to oppose the demolition attended by over 300 people, and the National Trust published a full-page advertisement in the The Sydney Morning Herald signed by 93 high-profile citizens declaring that "Demolition would be an act of corporate vandalism that would do little for the image of an institution which declares an interest in serving the people of this state." The architect, Mayor of North Sydney, and Member for North Shore, Ted Mack, gave a speech to the protest that day, exclaiming: 

The designer of the bank's replacement tower, Graham Marriott Thorp, expressed to the City of Sydney's building committee that the preservation of the building's would be an "dangerous and expensive venture", that the Institute of Architects did not represent all architects, and that "the Art Deco period was not a great period of architecture .. the fad of preserving Art Deco buildings would pass as quickly as the Art Deco period itself ... The building is not worthy preservation, being ugly, no longer fulfilling its useful purpose, and having a limited life to its facade." In stark contrast, heritage architect Ian Stapleton expressed his view that the Rural Bank was "one of the finest art deco buildings in Australia."

In March 1982, in the face of the advocacy from the Institute of Architects, National Trust, and a 4,809-signature petition opposing demolition, the City of Sydney's building committee initially rejected the application and recommended that the Rural Bank Building be protected for its heritage value. In April 1982, eminent architecture academic and architecture critic for The Sydney Morning Herald, Professor John Haskell, opined on the merits of the replacement design:

The council had to consider the demolition application more than six times before it was approved by the council by 14–9 in May 1982. In response, Alderman Jeremy Bingham, the leader of the Civic Reform Association opposition to the right-wing Labor majority council led by Doug Sutherland, accused the Labor aldermen who supported demolition of obeying the NSW State Labor Government of Neville Wran and selling out the heritage of Sydney, while Independent Alderman Clover Moore declared that Sutherland would become known as "the Judas of Martin Place" for his role in the bank's destruction. In August 1982, the bank building was placed on the Register of the National Estate, a listing which came too late and did not prevent the demolition hoardings from going up in September 1982.

With the building demolished by January 1983, the Australian Heritage Commission moved to delist the site from the Register of the National Estate, which was effected on 11 August 1987. The loss of the Rural Bank created significant interest in the preservation of Sydney's Art Deco buildings, and led to a greater appreciation and interest in saving these buildings from demolition, as well as an appreciated need to protect the scale and heritage of the Martin Place Precinct. By 1985, when the banks replacement State Bank Centre was nearing completion, the new Minister for Planning and Environment, Bob Carr, took action under the Heritage Act 1977 to preserve the "Martin Place Precinct", including placing conservation orders on the APA Building, MLC Building, Challis House, the GIO Building, and the Bank of NSW Building.

References

External links

Art Deco architecture in Sydney
Bank headquarters in Australia
Buildings and structures demolished in 1983
Demolished buildings and structures in Sydney
Former buildings and structures in Sydney
Former bank buildings in New South Wales
Martin Place
Office buildings completed in 1936
Office buildings in Sydney
1936 establishments in Australia
State Bank of New South Wales